Heyran Gondola lift (Télécabine) is a gondola lift in the Alborz mountain range, within Gilan Province of northwestern Iran.

It is located above the Heyran villages and near the city of Astara, in Astara County.

Description
Construction of Heyran Gondola lift is an important step towards the development of tourism in Gilan Province.

The Heyran Gondola lift has 30 ordinary cabins with six seats and also there are three special VIP cabins.

It has: views east of the Caspian Sea; views southwest to the Fandog Loo forests in the Alborz, and views north to the  Azerbaijan border area in the Alborz.

See also
 Heyran village, Astara
 List of gondola lifts
 List of ski areas and resorts in Iran

References

خبرگزاری دانشجویان ایران Ghatreh.com
شمال نیوز  Shomalnews.com
View the Gondola Lift's opening ceremony with the governor of Gilan Province

Gondola lifts in Iran
Astara County
Alborz (mountain range)
Tourist attractions in Gilan Province